Foundation for Advancing Alcohol Responsibility (Responsibility.org), formerly known as the Century Council, is an American not-for-profit organization founded in 1991 and funded by a group of distillers that aims to fight to eliminate drunk driving and underage drinking and promotes responsible decision-making regarding alcohol use.

The Arlington, Virginia-based organization is an independent national advisory board with members in the realm of education, medicine, government, business, and other relevant disciplines who assist in the development of programs and policies. Member companies include Bacardi, Beam Suntory, Brown-Forman, DIAGEO, Edrington, Mast-Jägermeister US, Moët Hennessy USA, and Pernod Ricard.

Programs and campaigns
The Foundation for Advancing Alcohol Responsibility (Responsibility.org) works with law enforcement, public officials, educators, parents and students to create programs aimed at reducing the incidents of drunk driving and underage drinking:
Alcohol 101 Plus is an interactive online program which aims to help students make safe and responsible decisions about alcohol on college campuses.
Ask, Listen, Learn: Kids and Alcohol Don't Mix (developed with Nickelodeon) encourages parents to create an ongoing dialogue about the dangers of alcohol with their kids.
B4UDrink Educator aims to educate adults about the influence of alcohol on an individual's blood alcohol content (BAC) level.
Cops in Shops is an alcohol law enforcement program in which undercover police officers work with participating alcoholic beverage retailers with the aim to deter youth under 21 from attempting to purchase alcohol or adults that purchase alcohol for minors.
Girl Talk: Choices and Consequences of Underage Drinking attempts to encourage mothers and daughters to communicate about the dangers of underage drinking and the specific risks facing teenage girls.
National Hardcore Drunk Driving Project provides a comprehensive resource for state legislators, local policy makers, highway safety officials, law enforcement officers, judges, prosecutors, community advocates, and treatment professionals to effectively deal with hardcore drunk drivers.
We Don't Serve Teens (developed with The Federal Trade Commission) is a public awareness campaign designed to prevent underage drinking by informing adults that providing underage drinkers with alcohol is unsafe, illegal and irresponsible.

In 2008–2009, FAAR sponsored the National Student Advertising Competition held by the American Advertising Federation.  Over 140 college teams from across the country competed to create a campaign aimed at reducing binge drinking among college students. The winning campaign was from Syracuse University.

Responsibility.org launched Think Responsibly, a campaign directed to millennial adults of legal purchase age who choose to drink, in partnership with Wine & Spirits Wholesalers of America (WSWA) and the Distilled Spirits Council of the United States (DISCUS) at the wholesalers' 76th annual convention in Orlando in 2019.

As part of the campaign, Think Responsibly ads asked visitors to take a quiz on responsible drinking. The quiz and online messages were measured by a Facebook Brand Lift Survey to determine how well the campaign increases a millennial's intention to drink responsibly.

Visuals with strong "calls to action" reached 4.8 million urban millennials on Facebook and Instagram. The brand lift study revealed the ads raised interest in and consideration of Think Responsibly, garnering a 1.3 point lift in ad recall of Responsibility.org among those who saw  to the campaign.

Speakers 
Every year the Foundation for Advancing Alcohol Responsibility sponsors TED Talks at high schools and at universities to warn people how dangerous drunk driving is. Most of these speakers have been featured on Rescue 911 and a clip of their episode is presented before each speaker takes the stage. Speakers include:

 Brandon Silveria and his father Tony from DUI Teen Driver
 Jody Woods from Sobering Save
 Paul Prater and Patricia Johnson from Repentant Drunk Driver 
 and Trent Winston and his mother Donna from Ex-RN Son Save

Name change

On April 2, 2014, The Century Council changed its name to the Foundation for Advancing Alcohol Responsibility, or Responsibility.org.

See also 
 Alcohol-related traffic crashes in the United States
 Drunk driving in the United States

References

External links
 www.responsibility.org 
 www.alcohol101plus.org
 Ask, Listen, Learn: Kids and Alcohol Don't Mix
 www.dontserveteens.gov

Driving under the influence
Addiction organizations in the United States
Non-profit organizations based in Arlington, Virginia
Organizations established in 1991
Alcohol in the United States
1991 establishments in Virginia
Mental health organizations in Virginia